Soham or Sohum is a Hindu mantra, meaning "I am He/She/That" in Sanskrit.

In Vedic philosophy it means identifying oneself with the universe or ultimate reality.

The combination of  has also been interpreted as "I myself am the Swan", where the swan symbolizes the Atman.

Etymology
An etymology of  "swan, goose" as from  "I am that" is found in the 14th century commentary on the Vedas by Sayana (14th century).

Interpreted as a nominal sentence, it can also be read as "I am She/He" or "It/She/He is I". The term is found in Vedic literature, and is a phrase that identifies "oneself with the universe or ultimate reality".

History 

This phrase is found in Principal Upanishads such as the Isha Upanishad (verse 16), which ends:

 (...) तेजो यत्ते रूपं कल्याणतमं तत्ते पश्यामि योऽसावसौ पुरुषः सोऽहमस्मि ॥१६॥
 
 "The light which is thy fairest form, I see it. I am what She/He is" (trans. Max Müller)

Soham, or "I am She/He", is very common in ancient and medieval literature. Some examples include:

Upanishads

 Sannyasa Upanishads such as Naradaparivrajaka Upanishad, Nirvana Upanishad, Ashrama Upanishad, Maitreya Upanishad and Satyayaniya Upanishad.
 Yoga Upanishads such as Dhyanabindu Upanishad and Yogashikha Upanishad
 Hamsa Upanishad

Tantras

 Gandharva Tantra
 Kali Tantra
 Kularnava Tantra
 Mahanirvana Tantra
 Niruttara Tantra

Stotras

 Bhaja Gaureesam
 Gowresa Ashtakam
 Shakthi Mahimnah Stotram
 Tripurasundari Vijaya Sthava

Adi Shankara's Vakya Vritti subsequent works in the Nath tradition foundational for Hatha yoga.

 Matsyendranath's Yogavishaya
 Gorakshanath's Siddha Siddhanta Paddhati
 Gorakshanath's Yoga Bija
 Gorakshanath's Goraksha Shataka
 Jñāndev's Lakhota
 Jñāndev's Yogapar Abhangamala
foundational for Swara yoga the original script Shiva Svarodaya
as well as the classical yoga treatises Gheranda Samhita and Shiva Samhita all make mention of soham and hamsa describing its significance and when teaching uniformly teaches So on inhalation and ham on exhalation.

This traditional practice in its several forms and its background is described in numerous other books.

Hamsa 

Swami Muktananda - although teaching the traditional So on inhalation and ham on exhalation as a letter from 1968 to Franklin Jones reveals - later published a book teaching Ham on inhalation and sa on exhalation. This practice is described in several later books all referring to Muktananda.

The teaching of Ham on inhalation and sa on exhalation is allegedly alluded to in a text of Kaśmir Śaivism, the Vijnana Bhairava:

However, this verse 155b is not found in the Vijnana Bhairava first published in 1918 in the Kashmir Series of Text and Studies but is quoted from a commentary by the Abhinavagupta disciple Kṣemarāja in his Shiva Sutra Vimarshini (commentary on the Shiva Sutras) in later editions of Vijnana Bhairava.

Yoga
When used for meditation, "Sohum" acts as a natural mantra to control one's breathing pattern, to help achieve deep breath, and to gain concentration.

 Sooooo... is the sound of inhalation, and is remembered in the mind along with that inhalation.
 Hummmm... is the sound of exhalation, and is remembered in the mind along with that exhalation.

Soham is also considered a mantra in Tantrism and Kriya Yoga, known also as Ajapa mantra, Ajapa Gayatri, Hamsa Gayatri, Hamsa mantra, prana mantra, Shri Paraprasada mantra, paramatma-mantra, and as such used notably on its own, in the meditation practice ajapa japa and in the kriya practice shabda sanchalana.

See also 
 Aham Brahmasmi
 I Am that I Am
 Dualism (Indian philosophy)
 Nondualism
 Monism
 Tattvam Asi

References

Bibliography

Meditation
Yoga concepts
Hindu mantras

pl:Ajapa yoga